The L-number system is a semi-scientific classification system of catfish based on photographs of shipments of tropical catfish of the family Loricariidae published by the German aquarium magazine DATZ (Die Aquarien- und Terrarienzeitschrift (The Aquarium and Terrarium Magazine)). The first L-number was published in 1988.

An L-number is not a formal scientific designation, but it allows people to identify various loricariid catfish by a "common name" before the fish is officially described. When a loricariid receives an official scientific name, the L-number (or numbers) is retired; best practice is then to use the scientific name.

A specific L-number classification does not guarantee a discrete species, multiple L numbers have been given to different populations of the same species. To add to the confusion, sometimes a single L-number may be used for multiple species.

Additionally the aquarium magazine 'Das Aquarium' introduced a similar system using the prefix 'LDA'.

L-number catfish articles 
The L-numbers are listed below in numerical order. The preceding number holds precedence over the higher or "alternative" L-numbers; but can sometimes be used to describe the same species or type from another locality.

References

Loricariidae
Fishkeeping